Yekeh Sur (also Romanized as Yekeh Sūr) is a village in Qaleh Qafeh Rural District, in the Central District of Minudasht County, Golestan Province, Iran. At the 2006 census, its population was 102, in 23 families.

References 

Populated places in Minudasht County